Kumara Krishnappa Nayak was a ruler of the Madurai Nayak dynasty. He was the successor of King Vishwanatha Nayak. He started ruling the country after his father's death in 1564. He made Tiruchirapalli as his capital.

Expansion of the dynasty
Under Kumara Krishnappa Nayak's rule, the Madurai Nayak dynasty expanded. Most of the ancient Pandyan territories came under the Nayaks under his rule. In 1565 the Sultan rulers of the Deccan defeated Vijayanagar, the suzerain of the Nayaks, at the battle of Talikota. Vijayanagar had to abandon their capital Vijayanagara and reestablish at Penukonda in Anantapur, then reestablish at Vellore Fort and Chandragiri near Tirupathi, which later granted land to the British East India Company to build a fort at the present day Chennai. Finally they settled at Vellore in North Arcot. Their governors at Madurai, Kalahasti, Gingee and Tanjore still paid them tribute and other marks of respect; but in later years, when their suzerainty became weak, the Nayaks ruled independently.

Succession
Krishnappa was succeeded by his two sons Muttu Krishnappa and Muttu Virapppa in 1573.

References

Madurai Nayak dynasty